Valley Heights Secondary School (in French, "L'École Secondaire Valley Heights") is a two-story rural high school located near Walsingham, Ontario, Canada. The official initials for this high school are VHSS.

History
Opened in 1971, Valley Heights sits on a property that spans  and includes fields, Carolinian forests, rivers and marshy areas.  During the 2000–01 school year there were approximately 700 students. However, a Roman Catholic school based out of Simcoe opened in 2001, which offered students newer equipment and more course choices (even though it was the closest to Simcoe Composite School). This, with the elimination of grade thirteen in Ontario, resulted in a decrease in student population down to 500.

Mrs. Jody Hevesi runs the Hidden Valley Cafe, which has been a staple at Valley Heights Secondary school since its establishment in the year 2000. As a "healthy" school, energy drinks have been banned from the premises in September 2011 along with non-baked foods and breaded foods. A similar ban was enforced at school in Hove, England; where Headteacher Malvina Sanders states that "consuming high-energy drinks can have a detrimental impact on the ability of young people to concentrate in class."

A roof fire occurred on July 25, 2012 on top of the gymnasium as a result of a botched roofing job. It cost the school $25,000 in overall damages and the damaged areas were secured before the thunderstorms that occurred early the next morning. Repairs were officially completed on July 31; not affecting any classes or activities that started in September 2012.

VHSS has beefed up their academics programs to entice possible transfer students. Plans to close down Port Dover Composite School came into reality on the night of January 31, 2013.

Campus
This school is the only high school in the entire Haldimand-Norfolk-Brant region to receive top marks for stewardship of the environment, minimizing the waste of natural resources, and conserving energy for future generations of Valley Heights students. The idea was started in 2008 and was deemed successful in 2011. Even though a sizeable number of students who attend Valley Heights are not Mennonites, the location of the school makes it ideal for Mennonites to attend as it is adjacent to the farmland that their parents work on.

Valley Heights Secondary School is partially powered by solar energy coming from solar panels installed in the immediate vicinity.

Athletics and clubs
The school team is called the "Bears" or "Voyageurs," the school colors are purple and white and the school logo is the Voyageur Bear.  The Valley Heights Bears won numerous football championships several years in a row in the 1990s. During the late 1980s and the early 1990s, the Bears won numerous titles over their rivals, the Simcoe Sabres. Valley Heights sports teams include: Canadian football, hockey, volleyball (junior and senior), basketball (junior and senior), cheerleading, tug-of-war, cross country, track and field, rowing, soccer (association football) and wrestling.

Valley Heights also has a large cross country running course. The school has hosted the Norfolk County High School cross country meet on numerous occasions.

Each sport is offered for both genders except football (male students only) and cheerleading (traditionally for female students only, but male students are encouraged to try out). Alongside Canadian football, Valley Heights has excelled at women's volleyball, men's tug-of-war (eight consecutive titles in the 1990s), cross country, and rowing.

Possible futures
As attendance continues to decline throughout the secular Grand Erie District School Board, one of the solutions would be to close down Simcoe Composite School and Waterford District High School while keeping Valley Heights Secondary and Delhi District Secondary School open. The students from the Simcoe high school and the Waterford high school would be consolidated into a giant secular high school spanning  somewhere in Norfolk County. Both VHSS and DDSS have the government funding and student enrolment figures to remain open on an indefinite basis.

By 2017, every school in Norfolk County (excluding Holy Trinity Catholic High School) will have a grand total of 1000 empty classroom seats. Reducing the number of high schools in the county would alleviate the burden of a rapidly aging population from paying extra property taxes during their time of financial need. The buildings that currently house SCS and WDHS can either be reconfigured into housing, corporate space, possible industry sites, or even demolished at taxpayers' cost.

Online education through the Internet could allow teachers to operate and to retain some form of employment; even if the building itself had to close sometime in the distant future and the school had to "operate" on a remote Internet server. Recent trends towards homeschooling and virtual high schools have also helped to play a role in declining high school attendance. If VHSS allowed young people from around the world to attend classes through their broadband Internet access, perhaps those online students could count towards being a part of the student attendance figures.

See also
List of high schools in Ontario

References

External links

VHSS Bears - Contact Us

Educational institutions established in 1971
High schools in Norfolk County, Ontario
1971 establishments in Ontario